Thomas Dix Hincks (1767 in Dublin, Ireland – 1857 in Belfast, Ireland) was an Irish orientalist and naturalist. He was a founding member of the Belfast Natural History Society and a member of the Royal Irish Academy.

Education 
Hincks was educated at Trinity College, Dublin.

Career 
Hincks was ordained a Presbyterian minister and worked at the Old Presbyterian Church (Unitarian) on Princes Street in Cork. After teaching in the Cork Institution, which he founded, he taught in Fermoy, County Cork. In 1821 he was appointed Master of the Classical School at the Belfast Academical Institution, in 1822 becoming Professor of Oriental Languages. He gained a Doctorate in Laws from Glasgow University in 1834.
He wrote A Greek-English Lexicon. Containing all the words that occur in the books used in most schools and collegiate courses London: Whittaker & Co. Dublin and edited the Munster Agricultural Magazine in Cork. For Rees's Cyclopædia he contributed the article on Ireland (Vol 19), 1811 and other Irish topics. The Philosophical Magazine article (1820) also says he wrote about Geography.

Personal life 
Hincks was the father of three distinguished sons: (1) the Orientalist, Edward Hincks (2) William Hincks, Professor of Natural History, and (3) Sir Francis Hincks, Canadian politician and Governor of Barbados.

References

Additional sources 
Nash, R. and Ross, H.C.G. The development of natural history in early 19th century Ireland in From Linnaeus to Darwin: commentaries on the history of biology and geology Society for the bibliography of Natural History 13:27-

External links

Irish naturalists
Irish orientalists
1767 births
1857 deaths
Scientists from Dublin (city)
Irish magazine editors
Irish non-subscribing Presbyterian ministers
Irish Unitarians
Members of the Royal Irish Academy